The Knowhere Guide was a crowd-sourced online guide to British towns.  It was originally a guide to the skateboarding scene in the UK and was founded in 1994.  It is quoted by British guide books, such as Rough Guides, as a recommended source of online information.  The guide also included a fictional town known as "Chuffing Hell", which has been mistaken as a real town by commercial web based directories.

The site's comments about the town of Crawley were seen to be so negative that local MP Laura Moffatt stated, "We should have the ability to take things down."  The site was also blamed for encouraging illegal skateboarding in Halesowen.

As of August 2022, the site is no longer available online.

References

British travel websites
Skateboarding mass media